Richmond East was a provincial electoral district for the Legislative Assembly of British Columbia, Canada. It was replaced by the Richmond-Queensborough electoral district after the British Columbia electoral redistribution, 2015.

Demographics

Geography

History

Member of Legislative Assembly 
Its only MLA was Hon. Linda Reid, a former teacher. She was first elected in 1991 and represents the British Columbia Liberal Party. Ms. Reid was appointed Minister of State for Early Childhood Development on June 5, 2001.

Election results 

|- bgcolor="white"
!align="right" colspan=3|Total Valid Votes
!align="right"|18,481
|- bgcolor="white"
!align="right" colspan=3|Total Rejected Ballots
!align="right"|184
!align="right"|0.99%
|- bgcolor="white"
!align="right" colspan=3|Turnout
!align="right"|18,665
!align="right"|45.16%
|}

|-

|-
 
|NDP
|Gian Sihota
|align="right"|6,692
|align="right"|33.01%
|align="right"|
|align="right"|$16,623

|Independent
|Mohamud Ali Farah
|align="right"|207
|align="right"|1.02%
|align="right"|
|align="right"|$651

|- bgcolor="white"
!align="right" colspan=3|Total Valid Votes
!align="right"|20,272
!align="right"|100%
!align="right"|
|- bgcolor="white"
!align="right" colspan=3|Total Rejected Ballots
!align="right"|182
!align="right"|0.90%
!align="right"|
|- bgcolor="white"
!align="right" colspan=3|Turnout
!align="right"|20,454
!align="right"|53.01%
!align="right"|
|}

|-

|-
 
|NDP
|Willy Nasgowitz
|align="right"|2,550
|align="right"|14.11%
|align="right"|
|align="right"|$2,541

|Independent
|Mohamud Ali Farah
|align="right"|173
|align="right"|0.96%
|align="right"|
|align="right"|$440
|- bgcolor="white"
!align="right" colspan=3|Total Valid Votes
!align="right"|18,067
!align="right"|100.00%
!align="right"|
|- bgcolor="white"
!align="right" colspan=3|Total Rejected Ballots
!align="right"|78
!align="right"|0.43%
!align="right"|
|- bgcolor="white"
!align="right" colspan=3|Turnout
!align="right"|18,145
!align="right"|70.59%
!align="right"|
|}

|-

 
|NDP
|Balwant Sanghera
|align="right"|5,763
|align="right"|31.40%
|align="right"|
|align="right"|$20,448
|-

|Natural Law
|Carina Shelly
|align="right"|43
|align="right"|0.23%
|align="right"|
|align="right"|$100
|- bgcolor="white"
!align="right" colspan=3|Total Valid Votes
!align="right"|18,353
!align="right"|100.00%
!align="right"|
|- bgcolor="white"
!align="right" colspan=3|Total Rejected Ballots
!align="right"|140
!align="right"|0.76%
!align="right"|
|- bgcolor="white"
!align="right" colspan=3|Turnout
!align="right"|18,493
!align="right"|71.62%
!align="right"|
|}

|-

|-
 
|NDP
|Ron Fontaine
|align="right"|6,096
|align="right"|36.31%
|align="right"|
|align="right"|$24,505

|- bgcolor="white"
!align="right" colspan=3|Total Valid Votes
!align="right"|16,792
!align="right"|100.00%
!align="right"|
|- bgcolor="white"
!align="right" colspan=3|Total Rejected Ballots
!align="right"|494
!align="right"|2.86%
!align="right"|
|- bgcolor="white"
!align="right" colspan=3|Turnout
!align="right"|17,286
!align="right"|75.79%
!align="right"|
|}

External links 
Result of 1991 election
2009 Official Election Results by Candidate
Result of 2001 election (pdf)
2001 Expenditures (pdf)
Result of 1996 election
1996 Expenditures
1991 Expenditures
Website of the Legislative Assembly of British Columbia
BC Stats Profile - 2001 (pdf)

British Columbia provincial electoral districts
Politics of Richmond, British Columbia
Provincial electoral districts in Greater Vancouver and the Fraser Valley